Utian Island, also known as Brooker Island, is an island in Papua New Guinea, part of the Calvados Chain within the Louisiade Archipelago. It is located at the western end of the Calvados Chain, in the Louisiade Archipelago, in the Milne Bay Province.

References

Islands of Milne Bay Province
Louisiade Archipelago